Der Hauptmann von Köpenick (The Captain of Köpenick) is the title of several films, plays, and television shows, all about the Hauptmann von Köpenick affair in 1906.

The Captain of Köpenick (play) (1931), by Carl Zuckmayer

The Captain from Köpenick (1926 film)
The Captain from Köpenick (1931 film)
The Captain from Köpenick (1945 film)
The Captain from Köpenick (1956 film), starring Heinz Rühmann

 Der Hauptmann von Köpenick (1997 film), TV film starring Harald Juhnke

See also
 The Captain from Köpenick (disambiguation)